Boulsa Airport  is a public use airport located near Boulsa, Namentenga, Burkina Faso.

See also
List of airports in Burkina Faso

References

External links 
 Airport record for Boulsa Airport at Landings.com

Airports in Burkina Faso
Namentenga Province